Krishna Raj (born 22 February 1967) is an Indian politician and having affiliations with Bharatiya Janata Party (BJP) who is the former Union Minister of State of Agriculture & Farmers Welfare, India. She was elected to Uttar Pradesh assembly in 1996 & 2007 from Mohammadi seat. She contested 2014 Lok Sabha elections from Shahjahanpur seat of Uttar Pradesh as BJP / NDA candidate and elected to 16th Lok Sabha.

Early life and education

Krishna Raj was born in Faizabad, Uttar Pradesh on February 22, 1967 to Ram Dulare and Sukh Rani. She completed her Master of Arts (M.A.) degree from Dr. Ram Manohar Lohia Avadh University, Faizabad.

Positions held
 1996-2002: Member, Uttar Pradesh Legislative Assembly.
 2007-2012: Member, Uttar Pradesh Legislative Assembly (second term).
 14 May 2014 Elected to 16th Lok Sabha.
 1 Sep. 2014-5 July 2016: 
↔Member, Committee on Petitions.
↔Member, Standing Committee on Energy.
↔Member, Consultative Committee, Ministry of Rural Development, Panchayati Raj and Ministry of Drinking Water and Sanitation
 13 May 2015 – 5 July 2016: Member, Joint Committee on the Right to Fair Compensation and Transparency in Land Acquisition, Rehabilitation and Resettlement (Second Amendment) Bill, 2015.
 1 May 2016 – 5 July 2016: Member, Committee on Public Undertakings.
 5 July 2016: Union Minister of State of Women and Child Development, India.
 4 September 2017: Union Minister of State of Agriculture & Farmers Welfare, India.

References

1969 births
Uttar Pradesh MLAs 2007–2012
India MPs 2014–2019
Living people
Lok Sabha members from Uttar Pradesh
People from Shahjahanpur district
Women in Uttar Pradesh politics
Bharatiya Janata Party politicians from Uttar Pradesh
21st-century Indian women politicians
21st-century Indian politicians
Women union ministers of state of India
Dr. Ram Manohar Lohia Avadh University alumni